Macrocamptus virgatus is a species of beetle in the family Cerambycidae. It was described by Gahan in 1890, originally under the genus Cylindrepomus. It is known from Laos.

References

Dorcaschematini
Beetles described in 1890